Aurelia Bouchez (born January 20, 1960) is a French diplomat who was Ambassador to Azerbaijan and the European Union Ambassador to Kazakhstan from 2011 until 2015.

In 2021 she became the French ambassador to Uzbekistan, replacing Isabelle Servoz-Gallucci.

References

Ambassadors of France to Azerbaijan
French women ambassadors
Ambassadors of the European Union to Azerbaijan
1960 births
Living people
Ambassadors of the European Union to Kazakhstan
Ambassadors of the European Union to Uzbekistan